In anatomy, a lobe is a clear anatomical division or extension of an organ (as seen for example in the brain, lung, liver, or kidney) that can be determined without the use of a microscope at the gross anatomy level. This is in contrast to the much smaller lobule, which is a clear division only visible under the microscope.

Interlobar ducts connect lobes and interlobular ducts connect lobules.

Examples of lobes
The four main lobes of the brain
the frontal lobe
the parietal lobe
the occipital lobe
the temporal lobe
The three lobes of the human cerebellum
the flocculonodular lobe
the anterior lobe
the posterior lobe
The two lobes of the thymus
The two and three lobes of the lungs
Left lung: superior and inferior
Right lung: superior, middle, and inferior
The four lobes of the liver
Left lobe of liver
Right lobe of liver
Quadrate lobe of liver
Caudate lobe of liver
The renal lobes of the kidney
Earlobes

Examples of lobules

the cortical lobules of the kidney
the testicular lobules of the testis
the lobules of the mammary gland
the pulmonary lobules of the lung
the lobules of the thymus

References

Anatomy